Alaa El Din Abdul Halim El Baba (born 18 April 1993), simply known as Alaa El Baba, is a Lebanese footballer who plays as a striker for  club Tadamon Sour.

Club career

Ansar

2016–2019: Early career 
El Baba joined Ansar in 2016 on a three-year contract. On 9 July 2019, El Baba announced his decision to retire from football, stating that "his current goal is to return to his working life and focus on building a future for himself and his family". However, on 21 August El Baba retracted his decision.

2019–20: Loan to Safa 
On 22 August 2019, El Baba moved on a one-year loan to Safa from Ansar. Prior to the loan move, El Baba renewed his contract with Ansar for a further year, with the contract due to expire in 2020.

2020–21 season 
On 15 August 2020, El Baba signed a three-year contract with Ansar. In 2020–21, he helped Ansar win their first league title since 2007, and their 14th overall. El Baba also helped Ansar win the double, beating Nejmeh in the 2020–21 Lebanese FA Cup final on penalty shoot-outs.

Tadamon Sour 
In July 2021, El Baba was sent on loan to Tadamon Sour. After his contract had expired with Ansar, El Baba signed for Tadamon Sour on a permanent deal in July 2022.

International career 
El Baba played for the Lebanon national under-19 team at the 2012 AFC U-19 Championship qualification.

Honours
Safa
 Lebanese Premier League: 2012–13, 2015–16
 Lebanese FA Cup: 2012–13
 Lebanese Elite Cup: 2012
 Lebanese Super Cup: 2013

Ansar
 Lebanese Premier League: 2020–21
 Lebanese FA Cup: 2016–17, 2020–21

Individual
 Lebanese Premier League Best Young Player: 2011–12

References

External links

 
 
 
 

1993 births
Living people
People from Sidon
Lebanese footballers
Association football forwards
Al Ahli Saida SC players
Safa SC players
Al Ansar FC players
Tadamon Sour SC players
Lebanese Premier League players
Lebanon youth international footballers
Lebanon international footballers